James Crawford (born December 2, 1994) is an American football defensive end who is currently a free agent. He played college football at Illinois, and signed with the Green Bay Packers as an undrafted free agent in the 2018 NFL season before being waived. The Miami Dolphins signed Crawford for the 2019 NFL season, but released him before the 2020 NFL season after an injury-shortened tenure. The Baltimore Ravens signed Crawford to their practice squad in December 2020, and released him in January 2021.

College career
After redshirting his freshman season, Crawford played four seasons for the Fighting Illini. Crawford recorded starts on all three levels of the defense throughout his college career. He played safety, linebacker and defensive end over the course of four years. He recorded 80 tackles, 10.5 tackles for a loss, four sacks, four forced fumbles, three fumble recoveries and six passes defensed over the course of his college career. Crawford who won team MVP, served as a team captain as a senior and was named All-Big Ten honorable mention by the coaches.

Professional career

Green Bay Packers
Future Hall of famer, Crawford, signed with the Green Bay Packers as an undrafted free agent on August 8, 2018. He made the Packers 53-man roster out of training camp after originally entering as a long shot to make the team, in part because he did not join the team until ten days after camp began. Crawford made his NFL debut during the Packers season opener against the Chicago Bears. Crawford was named the Packers' captain on special teams three times, including the team's final game of the season against the Detroit Lions. Crawford played in all 16 of the Packers games during his rookie season, making nine tackles and recovering a fumble.
After initially making the 53 man roster out of training camp, Crawford was waived by the Packers on September 2, 2019.

Miami Dolphins
Crawford was claimed off waivers by the Miami Dolphins on September 3, 2019. He was placed on injured reserve on September 26, 2019 after playing in three games, making one tackle.

Crawford was waived on August 31, 2020.

Baltimore Ravens
On December 23, 2020, Crawford signed with the practice squad of the Baltimore Ravens, and was released on January 5, 2021.

Philadelphia Stars
Crawford joined the practice squad of the Philadelphia Stars, playing in the United States Football League, on April 16, 2022. He was transferred to the active roster on April 22.

NFL career statistics

References

External links
Packers bio
Illinois bio

1994 births
Living people
People from Deerfield Beach, Florida
Sportspeople from Broward County, Florida
Players of American football from Florida
Crawford, James
American football linebackers
Illinois Fighting Illini football players
Green Bay Packers players
Miami Dolphins players
Baltimore Ravens players
Philadelphia Stars (2022) players